Teli ka Mandir, also known as Telika Temple, is a Hindu temple located within the Gwalior Fort in Madhya Pradesh, India. Dedicated to Shiva, Vishnu and Matrikas, it has been variously dated between the early 8th and early 9th century CE.

It is an atypical design for a Hindu temple, as it has a rectangular sanctum instead of the typical square. It integrates the architectural elements of the Nagara style and the Valabhi prasada. The temple is based on a Gurjara Pratihara-Gopagiri style North Indian architecture.

The temple is a classic example of a design based on "musical harmonics" in architecture, one that Hermann Goetz called as a masterpiece of late Gupta era Indian art.

Location 
The temple is located inside the fort of Gwalior, north Madhya Pradesh. The city is connected by major highways NH 44 and 46 (Asian Highway 43 and 47), a railway station and airport (IATA: GWL). It is located near other historic Hindu and Jain temples from the medieval era, as well the major group of Vaishnavism, Shaivism and Shakism temples such as the Bateshwar Temples near Morena with dozens of standing temples and the ruins of over 100 small pancharatha-style temples, the Naresar group with 22 temples, and the Mahua group of temples most of which are dated to between the 6th and 10th century. They exemplify various variations in the Nagara style of Hindu architecture as well as the application of vastu mandala symmetry principles in novel ways.

The Telika Mandir is one of the historic temples within the Gwalior old city. It is in the middle of the old town, built on a high point which makes it stand out from different locations within the fort. The site of the Teli ka Mandir and other historic temples is found in early inscriptions. Some of these refer to the town as Gopagiri.

History 
The Telika Mandir is generally dated to between 8th and 9th century based on paleography, art-style, architectural design and small inscriptions found within the temple premises. According to Michael Meister, an art historian and a professor specializing in Indian temple architecture, the temple was built by 750 CE, per the most recently discovered inscriptions in Gwalior. George Michell, another art historian and a professor specializing in Indian temples, the temple was complete by the 9th century. Bharne and Krusche place the temple between 700 and 750 CE, while Allen places it in the 8th century. According to Allen, some local literature states it to be from the 11th century, but the evidence suggests that this late chronology is inaccurate. According to Bajpai, the temple may have been built during the reign of the Gurjara-Pratihara Mihira Bhoja.

The temple shows signs of extensive damage and change. It was badly damaged in the plunder raids by Muslim army of Qutb-ud-din Aibak and his successor Iltutmish in 1232 CE along with other temples in the fort following a jauhar, parts of the ruins were then used to apparently build a mosque nearby. The mosque was in turn apparently destroyed by Hindu Maratha army centuries later. The temple was restored by the Hindus after the desecration by Iltutmish forces, which speculated Cunningham, may explain some of the features that appear from a later era. The temple has icons and inscriptions related to all three major traditions of Hinduism: Shaivism, Vaishnavism and Shaktism. One of the inscriptions, for example, is a metrical hymn about Durga. The relief work includes a prominent Garuda, the vahana of Vishnu. Inside the temple is a Shiva linga.

The temple was in ruins in the 19th century. Between 1881 and 1883, repairs to the temple were initiated by Major Keith, an officer of the Royal Scots Regiment stationed in Gwalior.

Nomenclature 
The origin of the temple's name is unclear. It literally means Oilman's Temple, but neither the inscriptions nor texts attest to such a name. According to Allen, there is no satisfactory explanation for this name. Local folklore states that the temple was built by oil merchant caste rather than kings, the royal class or the priestly class.

Description 

It has a large kapili projecting portico of about  towards the east. It likely had amalaka, kalasha and other ornaments on top, but these are all lost to history. The walls of temple has numerous niches for statues, but it is all empty now and show signs of damage. The niches are topped by tall pediments. The outer dimensions of the sanctum are 60x40 feet with an 80 feet tower above.

Above the doorway is a relief of Garuda, the vahana of Vishnu. Inside, there is another doorway above which is a Ganesha relief. There is a Nandi and lingam inside in the sanctum. The temple entrance and panels have several inscriptions, three of which are short likely from pre-10th century and others are longer from 15th-century. The latter inscriptions suggest that the temple was a Shaiva shrine by the 15th century. One of the inscriptions discovered is a metrical hymn about Durga, which suggests a Shakta tradition influence. The temple lacks a covered mandapa, but includes a circumambulatory path. This path has four entrances, one from each cardinal direction which a devotee can use to enter the temple for a darshana.

The temple is approached through a flight of stairs leading to a banded doorway containing sculptures of river goddesses Ganga and Yamuna with their waists leaning towards the center, each with a boy and a girl on the lower part. Above them are amorous couples in various stages of courtship and intimacy (mithuna). There are male and female dvarapalas along the outer and inner doorways, both genders carrying weapons and a kind expression of welcome, and possibly symbolizing the theology in Shaiva and Shakta traditions. Above the river goddess flanked eastern doorway are piled up chaitya-hall style gavaksha ornamentation, which reminds one of the Buddhist designs. The doorway leads to the sanctum sanctorum or garbha griha. There is a decorative sculpture of Garuda at the entrance to the temple.

The temple's Valabhi shikhara mirrors the gopuram of Dravidian temples and it stands on a Nagara base. The temple's outer walls have been extensively carved.

Analysis and reception

The Teli ka mandir is unusual in many ways, and its complex design has led to many contesting proposals for what influenced it or which temples it influenced. Proposals range from it being influenced by Buddhist architecture, or by South Indian temples, or it being an independent masterpiece innovation of the late Gupta era Hindu artists.

The temple sanctum plan seems rectangular rather than the typical square, one that makes it the oldest surviving Hindu temple with a rectangular plan in Central India. According to Michael Meister, a professor specializing on Indian temple architecture, the temple is actually a study in squares nevertheless because its rectangles are formed by combining squares. The extensive damage and dislocation of its ruins before the 20th-century has led to misidentification and misclassification of the temple. According to Meister, and Hermann Goetz, the temple was broadly assumed in the colonial era to have been a Vishnu temple that was later converted into Shiva temple, the temple may have actually started as a temple dedicated to the Matrikas (mother goddesses), but one that included the motifs of Vaishnanism and Shaivism. The evidence for these are now in the ruins held by the Gwalior Museum and Delhi National Museum. Similarly, the assumed "southern influence" is likely an incorrect hypothesis as well, proposed by those who saw something similar in the South Indian majestic gopuram or the vaulted roofs at Mahabalipuram, Tamil Nadu. However, the influence could have been the other way around or possibly the result of collaboration between pan-Indian artist guilds. Post-colonial era studies have identified similar ruined barrel-vault capped historic temples in many places in north and east India, including those in Odisha. Closer study of the keel vault details suggest that the ideas are markedly different expressions of an idea, rather than a copy.

The Teli ka temple of Gwalior is closest in its plan to a 4x4 square grid, yet different. According to Michael Meister this innovation is carried across the temple deliberately in its Bhadra, Pratibhadra, Karna, Kapota, Kumbha, Bhitta and other elements,

Gallery

See also
Khajuraho Group of Monuments
Nachna Hindu temples
Siddhachal Caves

References

Bibliography

Dehejia, V. (1997). Indian Art. Phaidon: London. .

Harle, J.C., The Art and Architecture of the Indian Subcontinent, 2nd edn. 1994, Yale University Press Pelican History of Art, 

Hindu temples in Madhya Pradesh
Vishnu temples
Tourist attractions in Gwalior